Olowu may refer to

 the Olowu of Owu Kingdom, paramount Yoruba king of Owu kingdom

Olowu is the name of

 Princess Elizabeth Olowu (born 1939), Nigerian princess and sculptor
 Karim Olowu (born 1924), Nigerian sprinter and long jumper 
 Pius Olowu (born (1948), Uganda sprinter
 Unhokhasor Olowu (c.1855 - 1967), Nigerian trader
 Duro Olowu, British fashion designer
 Joseph Olowu, English footballer